SS Oslofjord was a small steam-powered ship built in 1923, with a tonnage of only 215. She was originally named SS Mari, but she was renamed already in 1923. Oslofjord was sold in 1930.

References

External links 
 

Passenger ships of Norway
Ships built in Sandefjord
Steamships